Season three of Mexico's Next Top Model, the Mexican adaptation of Tyra Banks' America's Next Top Model, aired on Sony Entertainment Television from September to November 2012. The show was hosted by Mexican model Elsa Benítez. Former judge Jo Lance was replaced by fashion correspondent and consultant Antonio González de Cosío.

The prize package for this season included a US$100,000 modeling contract with Queta Rojas management, a cover feature and an editorial spread in Elle magazine, an all-expenses paid trip to New York City to meet with modeling agencies, and a brand new Volkswagen.

The winner of the competition was 18-year-old Sahily Córdova from Hermosillo, Sonora.

Cast

Contestants

(Ages stated are at start of contest)

Judges
 Elsa Benitez (host)
 Allan Fis 
 Antonio González de Cosío
 Glenda Reyna

Other cast members
 Óscar Madrazo - creative director

Episodes

Results

 The contestant was eliminated
 The contestant won the competition

Episode 1 : Queen Of Spicy

Episode 2 : Photo Group And Commercial On a Team For Pizza Hut Campaign

Episode 3 : Animal Personality

Episode 4 : Couple Photo Shoot With Devil And Tortured Girl In Hell

Episode 5 : Disgusting Beauty Shoot In Fashion

Episode 6 : Erotic And Romantic Sensualism Capture In Motion Video With Male Model

Episode 7 : Spectacular Mermaid In Aquarium 

Episode 8 : Dramatic In Poor African's Slum Village For Campaign "Free Poor From Africa"

Episode 9 : Knight Of the Ancient Islamic Kingdom At the Sand Mosque of Mali

Episode 10 : Wild Life African Jungle Tribe In Kongo

Episode 11 : Ethiopian Locals In Traditional Dress And Culture

Episode 12 : Avant Garde In Victoria Falls Valley

Episode 14 : New Fashion In Madagascar,Cover Nature Magazine,Beauty Shoot Undersea,Laugh Beauty Shoot,Avant Garde High Fashion In Portfolio,Dramatize Motional Video Madagascar

Notes

References

External links
 Official Website

Mexico's Next Top Model
2012 Mexican television seasons